Antoine du Verdier (11 November 1544 – 25 September 1600), lord of Vauprivast, was a French politician and writer.

Du Verdier was born in Saint-Bonnet-le-Château, Loire.  He was conseiller du roi and controller-general in Lyon, but is best known for his work as a bibliographer alongside his friend and contemporary François Grudé.

Publications
 Prosopographie, description des personnages-insignes, avec portraits, Lyon, 1573
 Bibliothèque d'Ant. Duverdier, contenant le catalogue de tous les auteurs qui ont écrit en français, 1585, valuable work of bibliography, reprinted in 1772–1773 with that of the La Croix du Maine.

Notes

Sources

External links

 Portrait, à Cartari, Vincenzo (1531 - ca 1571): Imagines Deorum, Qui Ab Antiquis Colebantur (1581)
 La Croix du Maine, Antoine du Verdier, "Les Bibliothèques françoises", Paris, Saillant & Nyon, 1773, numbered by Google Books :
 1st volume La Croix du Maine, volume 1
 2nd volume La Croix du Maine, volume 2
 3rd volume Du Verdier, volume 1
 4th volume Du Verdier, volume 2
 5th volume Du Verdier, volume 3
 6th volume Errata, epitomes bibliothecae gesnerianae, etc.
 Antoine du Verdier on data.bnf.fr

16th-century French writers
16th-century male writers
1544 births
1600 deaths
People from Montbrison, Loire
French politicians
French bibliographers
French humanists